Richhill is the name of a number of places:

 Richhill, County Armagh, Northern Ireland
 Richhill Township, Pennsylvania, United States
 Rich Hill (disambiguation)